The women's 100 metre backstroke competition at the 2010 Pan Pacific Swimming Championships took place on August 18 at the William Woollett Jr. Aquatics Center.  The last champion was Hanae Ito of Japan.

This race consisted of two lengths of the pool, all in backstroke.

Records
Prior to this competition, the existing world and Pan Pacific records were as follows:

Results
All times are in minutes and seconds.

Heats
The first round was held on August 18, at 10:48.

B Final 
The B final was held on August 18, at 19:10.

A Final 
The A final was held on August 18, at 19:10.

References

2010 Pan Pacific Swimming Championships
2010 in women's swimming